Klaus W. Larres is a German-born historian and political scientist, currently the Richard M. Krasno Distinguished Professor at University of North Carolina, and also an author. Larres was educated at the University of Cologne and the London School of Economics and Political Science. Before moving to the United States, Larres spent almost 18 years in the United Kingdom. Along with previously holding the Henry A. Kissinger Chair in
Foreign Policy and International Relations at Library of Congress, he is a member of the Royal Historical Society, International Institute for Strategic Studies and American Academy of Political and Social Science.

Works
 Politik der Illusionen. Churchill, Eisenhower und die deutsche Frage 1945–1955. Göttingen 1995, .
 The Federal Republic of Germany since 1949. Politics, society and economy before and after unification. London 1996. 
 Germany since unification. The domestic and external consequences. Basingstoke 1998. .
 Churchill's Cold War. The Politics of Personal Diplomacy. Yale 2006, .
 The Cold War after Stalin's death. A missed opportunity for peace? (with Kenneth Osgood) Lanham 2006, .
 A companion to Europe since 1945. Oxford 2009, .

References

Year of birth missing (living people)
Living people
University of North Carolina at Chapel Hill faculty
21st-century American historians
21st-century American male writers
American political scientists
University of Cologne alumni
American male non-fiction writers